Tupperware Brands Corporation, formerly Tupperware Corporation, is an American multinational company that produces home product lines that include kitchen gadgets, preparation, storage containers, and serving products for the kitchen and home. Its main focus is kitchen and household products, and it is particularly known for its line of plastic containers for food storage and preparation. By extension, plastic food containers in general, regardless of brand, are sometimes referred to as Tupperware.

History
Tupperware Brands Corporation was founded as The Tupperware Company in 1946 in South Grafton, Massachusetts by Earl Tupper. In 1951, Tupper and his wife moved the company's headquarters to Kissimmee, Florida, where they had purchased 1,000 acres of land. In 1958, Tupper sold The Tupperware Company for $16 million to Rexall. In December 2005, Tupperware Corporation changed its name to Tupperware Brands Corporation to reflect the company's increasing product diversity.

Since 1997, Tupperware has been directed by Rick Goings, until recently.

In 2020 Tupperware Brands Corp. appointed Miguel Fernandez as a new chief executive, who previously served in executive positions at Avon Products Inc. and Herbalife Nutrition Ltd., as CEO. He took  over the top position at the company April 6.

Brands
A decade after starting business in the United States, Tupperware expanded into Europe. By 1965, the company had a presence in six European countries, and then launched in Singapore, Japan, and Australia. Tupperware also had sales offices in Africa and Latin America before 1970. After that, Tupperware Brands expanded to almost 100 countries around the world under seven brands connected to it: the brands Tupperware, Avroy Shlain, BeautiControl, Fuller Cosmetics (including Armand Dupree), NaturCare, Nutrimetics, and Nuvo.

In 2008, due to its success in developing the brand's name in China, India, and Indonesia, Tupperware received awards for "Most Favored Brand by Women" and "Company with the Best Corporate Face."

Awards 
In 2010, the company was ranked equal #2 in Fortunes Most Admired Home equipment and furnishings section.

See also
Earl Tupper 
Brownie Wise 
Rick Goings 
Joe Hara

References

External links

Direct marketing
Marketing companies of the United States
Multinational companies headquartered in the United States
Companies based in Orlando, Florida
American companies established in 1946
Retail companies established in 1946
1946 establishments in Massachusetts
Companies listed on the New York Stock Exchange

de:Tupperware
fr:Tupperware
he:טאפרוור
ja:タッパーウェア
ru:Tupperware
fi:Tupperware
sv:Tupperware
zh:特百惠